The Polnocny (or Polnochny)-class ships are amphibious warfare vessels. They were designed in Poland, in cooperation with the Soviet Navy and were built in Poland between 1967 and 2002. They now serve in several different navies, and some have been converted to civilian use. The name comes from the Stocznia Północna shipyard (Northern Shipyard) at Gdańsk, where they were built. 107 were built by 1986 (last 16 by Stocznia Marynarki Wojennej (Naval Shipyard) at Gdynia, Poland). In 2002, one ship of a modernised design NS-722 was built in Gdynia for Yemen.

Characteristics
The Polnocny-class ships are classified as medium landing ships in the Russian Navy, and are loosely equivalent to Western tank landing ships. They are equipped with a bow ramp that allows beach landings. The Polnocny-C version can carry 12 BMP-2 armored personnel carriers, or 4 Main Battle Tanks, or 250 infantrymen with their weapons like 82 mm Mortars and ATGMs, or 250 tons of rations & stores. Unlike their Western counterparts, these ships can provide substantial fire support for landed troops with their onboard multiple rocket launchers. Other armament consists of anti-aircraft guns and short-range surface-to-air missiles.

Variants
The Polnocny class comprises several sub-types that vary in size and capacity:
Polnocny-A (Project 770) (46 built):
Displacement: 800 tons full load
Length: 73 m
Speed: 
Polnocny-B (Project 771) (36 built):
Displacement: 834 tons full load
Length: 73 m
Speed: 
Polnocny-C (Project 773) (24 built)
Displacement: 1150 tons full load
Length: 81.3 m
Speed: 
Modified Polnocny-C (Project 776) Amphibious Assault Command Ship (1 built - ORP Grunwald)
Displacement: 1253 tons full load
Length: 81.3 m
Speed: 
Polnocny-D (Project 773U) (4 built)
Displacement: 1233 tons full load
Length: 81.3 m
Speed: 
Aircraft facility: One helicopter platform
NS-722 class (1 built in 2002)
Displacement: 1,410 tons full load
Length: 88.7 m
Speed: 
Aircraft facility: One helicopter platform

Operational service
Built in large quantities, the Polnocny-class ships were once the mainstay of the Soviet amphibious forces, and gave the Soviet naval infantry an effective force projection capability. They were gradually phased out in favour of hovercraft, and few remain active in the Russian Navy.

Current operators
  - 3 ships
  - 1 Polnocny-B
  - 2 Polnocny-A, 2 Polnocny-B
  - 2 Polnocny-A (1 withdrawn from service, 1 operational )
  - 3 Polnocny-A
  4 Polnocny-D

  - 2 Polnocny-C
  - 3 Polnocny-B
  - 1 Polnocny-C (originally incorrectly reported captured by Russia and moved to Novorossiysk; subsequently noted as still active in the Ukrainian navy as of June 3, 2022)
  - 3 Polnocny-B
  - 1 NS-722

Former operators

See also
List of ships of the Soviet Navy
List of ships of Russia by project number

References

Bibliography
 
Watts, A.J.(2006); Jane's warship recognition guide; Collins; 
Jarosław Ciślak; Polska Marynarka Wojenna 1995 (Polish Navy 1995); Lampart, Warsaw 1995;

External links
 Indian Navy Polnochy class landing ship Bharat-rakshak.com
 All Polnocny-A Class Landing Ships - Complete Ship List
 All Polnocny-B Class Landing Ships - Complete Ship List
 All Polnocny-C Class Landing Ships - Complete Ship List

Amphibious warfare vessel classes
 Polnocny class landing ship
Poland–Soviet Union relations
Amphibious warfare vessels of the Polish Navy
Amphibious warfare vessels of the Soviet Navy
Amphibious warfare vessels of the Russian Navy
Amphibious warfare vessels of the Indian Navy
Amphibious warfare vessels of the Ukrainian Navy
Ships built in Gdynia
Naval ships built in Poland for export